Michael Maguire may refer to:

 Michael Maguire (actor) (born 1955), American actor
 Michael Maguire (footballer) (1894–1950), Australian rules footballer
 Michael Maguire (rugby league) (born 1975), Australian rugby league football coach
 Michael Maguire (Gaelic footballer) (born 1965), Irish Gaelic footballer
 Michael Maguire (ombudsman), Police Ombudsman for Northern Ireland

See also
Maguire (surname)
Michael McGuire (disambiguation)